beBee is a business and employment-oriented online service that operates via a website. The platform allows businesses to post jobs and users to post their CVs and interests. The website also incorporates a microblogging and social aspects.

The startup was established in February 2015, and originally launched in English, Spanish and Portuguese.

References

Spanish companies established in 2015
Privately held companies of Spain
Social networking websites
Professional networks
Internet properties established in 2015
Software companies of Spain